Craspedosomatidae is a family of millipedes in the order Chordeumatida. Most adult millipedes in this family have 30 segments (counting the collum as the first segment and the telson as the last), but some have only 28. There are at least 30 genera and 210 described species in Craspedosomatidae.

Genera

References

Further reading

 
 
 
 

Chordeumatida
Millipede families